Andrey Shchegolikhin is a Russian sprint canoer who competed in the late 1990s. He won two bronze medals at the ICF Canoe Sprint World Championships, earning them in 1998 (K-4 500 m) and 1999 (K-4 200 m).

References 

Living people
Russian male canoeists
Year of birth missing (living people)
ICF Canoe Sprint World Championships medalists in kayak